One third of Woking Borough Council in Surrey, England is elected each year, followed by one year without election. Since the last boundary changes in 2016, 30 councillors have been elected from 10 wards.

Political control
A borough called Woking had existed since 1974 and was controlled by the Conservative Party until the local elections in 1986. The partisan control of the borough has been as follows, with each poll electing one third of the seats, except where noted.

Leadership
The leaders of the council since 2006 have been:

Structure of the council

Borough result maps

By-election results

1990s

2000s

2010s

References

 By-election results

External links
 Woking Borough Council

 
Woking
Council elections in Surrey
District council elections in England